John Loftus Leigh-Pemberton AFC (1911–1997) was an artist and illustrator from the United Kingdom, best known for his book illustrations.

Life and work

Leigh-Pemberton was the great-grandson of Edward Leigh Pemberton. He was born on 18 October 1911 and was educated at Eton; he studied art in London between 1928 and 1932. During the Second World War he was a flying instructor for the RAF and was awarded the Air Force Cross in 1945.
As well as his book illustrations, Leigh-Pemberton carried out advertising work and decorated a number of ships. He also did work for the Shell Guides series. However perhaps his best-known work was carried out for the Ladybird series of books for children, where he wrote and illustrated many of the series dealing with natural history subjects.

References

1911 births
1997 deaths
People educated at Eton College
English illustrators
20th-century English painters
English male painters
British children's book illustrators
John
Recipients of the Air Force Cross (United Kingdom)
20th-century English male artists